An outdoor bronze bust of Vicente Rocafuerte by Amadeus Palacio Collmann is installed at Hermann Park's McGovern Centennial Gardens in Houston, Texas, in the United States.

See also
 List of public art in Houston

References

Bronze sculptures in Texas
Busts in Texas
Hermann Park
Monuments and memorials in Texas
Outdoor sculptures in Houston
Sculptures of men in Texas